The collared lark (Mirafra collaris) or collared bushlark is a species of lark in the family Alaudidae found in East Africa.

Distribution and habitat 
The collared lark has a considerable range, with an estimated global extent of occurrence of 530,000 km2 over an area from eastern Ethiopia and Somalia to central Kenya.

Its natural habitat is subtropical or tropical dry lowland grassland.

References

External links 

Species factsheet - BirdLife International

collared lark
Birds of the Horn of Africa
collared lark
Taxonomy articles created by Polbot